Castillo is a Spanish surname meaning "castle". The Portuguese version of this surname is Castilho.

People
Notable people with the surname include:

Actors, singers, musicians
Alberto Castillo (performer) (1914–2002), Argentine tango singer and actor
Alexandra Castillo (born 1971), Chilean-Canadian actress and dancer
Amy Perez-Castillo (born 1969), Filipino actress
Braulio Castillo (1933–2015), Puerto Rican telenovela actor
Braulio Castillo, hijo (born 1964), Puerto Rican actor
Daniela Castillo (born 1982), Chilean pop singer and actress
Emilio Castillo (contemporary), American saxophone player and composer
Eugene F. Castillo (contemporary), Filipino-American orchestra conductor
Guillermo Castillo (fl. 1920s), Cuban musician and songwriter
Isabella Castillo  (born 1994), Cuban singer and actress
Irán Castillo (born 1977), Mexican actress
Joey Castillo (born 1966), American rock drummer
Kate del Castillo (born 1972), Mexican actress
Mark Castillo (born 1980), American drummer
Rainier Castillo (born 1985), Filipino actor
Randy Castillo (1950–2002), American rock drummer

Military figures 

Bernal Díaz del Castillo (1492–1581), Spanish conquistador
Derricia Castillo-Salazar (born 1988), Belizean military officer and activist
Francisco Castillo Fajardo, Marquis of Villadarias (1642–1716), Spanish military general
José Castillo (Spanish Civil War) (1901–1936), Spanish Police Assault Guard lieutenant during the Second Spanish Republic

Sports figures

Baseball
Alberto Castillo (catcher) (born 1970), Dominican baseball catcher
Alberto Castillo (pitcher) (born 1975), Cuban baseball pitcher
Benny Castillo (born 1966), Dominican baseball player and manager
Bobby Castillo (1955–2014), American baseball pitcher
Braulio Castillo (baseball) (born 1968), Dominican baseball outfielder
Carlos Castillo (baseball) (both 1975), American baseball pitcher
Carmen Castillo (1958–2015), Dominican baseball outfielder
Diego Castillo (pitcher) (born 1994), Dominican baseball pitcher
Diego Castillo (infielder) (born 1997), Venezuelan baseball infielder
Fabio Castillo (born 1989), Dominican baseball pitcher
Frank Castillo (1969–2013), American baseball pitcher
José Castillo (infielder) (born 1982), Venezuelan baseball infielder
José Castillo (pitcher) (born 1996), Venezuelan baseball pitcher
Juan Castillo (pitcher) (born 1970), Venezuelan baseball pitcher
Juan Castillo (second baseman) (born 1962), Dominican baseball infielder
Lendy Castillo (born 1989), Dominican baseball pitcher
Luis Castillo (pitcher) (born 1992), Dominican baseball pitcher
Luis Castillo (second baseman) (born 1975), Dominican baseball infielder
Manny Castillo (born 1957), Dominican baseball infielder
Marty Castillo (born 1957), American baseball infielder and catcher
Rusney Castillo (born 1987), Cuban baseball outfielder
Tony Castillo (catcher) (born 1957), American baseball catcher
Tony Castillo (pitcher) (born 1963), Venezuelan baseball pitcher
Welington Castillo (born 1987), Dominican baseball catcher
Wilkin Castillo (born 1984), Dominican baseball catcher

Basketball
Liset Castillo (born 1973), Cuban basketball player 
Sauce Castillo, nickname of Canadian basketball player Nik Stauskas (born 1993)

Boxing
Chucho Castillo (1944–2013), Mexican boxer
Eliecer Castillo (born 1970), Cuban boxer
Eliseo Castillo (born 1975), Cuban boxer
José Luis Castillo (born 1973), Mexican boxer
Martín Castillo (born 1977), Mexican boxer
Ruben Castillo (boxer) (born 1957), American boxer

Football (soccer)
Christian Castillo (footballer) (born 1984), Salvadoran footballer
Edgar Castillo (born 1986), American footballer for Mexico
Juan Guillermo Castillo (born 1978), Uruguayan footballer
María de Jesús Castillo (born 1983), Mexican footballer
Nery Castillo (born 1984), Mexican footballer
Ramiro Castillo (1966–1997), Bolivian footballer
Segundo Castillo (born 1982), Ecuadoran footballer

Other sports
Brenda Castillo (born 1992), Dominican Republic volleyball player
Gil Castillo (born 1965), American martial arts fighter
Jesús Castillo Jr. (contemporary), Puerto Rican professional wrestler
Juan Castillo (American football) (born 1959), American football offensive line coach
Luis Castillo (American football) (born 1983), American football player
Christian Del Castillo (Floorball) (born 1993), Finnish floorball goalkeeper

Painters, sculptors
Jorge Castillo (artist) (born 1933), Spanish-Argentine painter and sculptor
José del Castillo (1737–1793), Spanish painter in the Absolutism movement

Politicians
Antonio Cánovas del Castillo (1828–1897), Spanish politician and historian; assassinated
Carlos Castillo Armas (1914–1957), President of Guatemala 1954–1957; assassinated
Carlos Castillo Medrano (died 2013), Guatemalan politician
Demetrio Castillo Duany (1856–1922), Cuban revolutionary, soldier, and politician
Jorge Del Castillo (born 1950), Peruvian lawyer and politician, former Prime Minister of Peru
Marcela Guerra Castillo (born 1959), Mexican politician
Miguel Santín del Castillo (1830–1880), President of El Salvador 1858–1860
Oscar Castillo (born 1954), Argentine politician, former governor of Catamarca Province
Pedro Castillo, Peruvian politician
Pilar del Castillo (born 1952), Spanish politician, Member of the European Parliament
Ramón Castillo (1873–1944), President of Argentina 1942–1943
Valdemar Castillo (born 1946), Belizean politician
Vincho Castillo (born 1931), Dominican lawyer and politician

Writers, novelists, poets
Abelardo Castillo (1935–2017), Argentine writer and editor
Alonso de Castillo Solórzano (1584–1647), Spanish novelist and playwright
Ana Castillo (born 1953), American novelist, poet, short story writer, and essayist
Cátulo Castillo (1906–1975), Argentine poet and tango music composer
Juan Ignacio González del Castillo (1763–1800), Spanish author of comic theater
Mary Castillo (born 1974), American author
Otto René Castillo (1936–1967), Guatemalan poet and revolutionary
Sandra M. Castillo (born 1962), Cuban-American poet
Sergio Badilla Castillo (born 1947), Chilean poet

Others
Christian Castillo (politician) (born 1967), activist in the Socialist Workers' Party (Argentina)
Heberto Castillo (1928–1997), Mexican civil engineer and political activist
Jorge Castillo (chef) (contemporary), Cuban-American chef and television personality
José de Jesús Castillo Rentería (1927–2013), Mexican Roman Catholic bishop
Karol Castillo (1989–2013), Peruvian beauty pageant winner
 Pedro Castillo (1790·1858), Venezuelan painter
Rafael Castillo, several people
Roberto Castillo, several people
Rosalio José Castillo Lara (1922–2007), Venezuelan archbishop and cardinal; Vatican official
Ruben Castillo (judge) (born 1954), United States District Judge
Sarai Sanchez Castillo (born 1981), Venezuelan woman chess grandmaster
Susie Castillo (born 1980), American beauty queen, Miss USA 2003

Fictional characters

Antón Castillo, main antagonist from Far Cry 6
Eden and Cruz Castillo, couple on the American soap opera Santa Barbara
Violetta Castillo, main character in the Disney series "Violetta".
Jimena Castillo, from Daughters of the Moon (book series)
Laurel Castillo, character from How to Get Away with Murder
Lt. Martin Castillo, from Miami Vice
Richard Castillo, Star Trek character
Zoë Castillo, character from the computer game Dreamfall: The Longest Journey

Geographical distribution
As of 2014, 24.8% of all known bearers of the surname Castillo were residents of Mexico (frequency 1:191), 9.4% Venezuela (1:122), 8.1% of the Philippines (1:479), 7.6% of the United States (1:1,813), 7.3% of Colombia (1:249), 6.6% of Peru (1:184), 4.1% of Chile (1:164), 4.1% of the Dominican Republic (1:98), 4.0% of Argentina (1:413), 3.6% of Guatemala (1:172), 3.4% of Spain (1:530), 2.8% of Cuba (1:158), 2.5% of Panama (1:61), 2.3% of Ecuador (1:267), 2.2% of Honduras (1:152), 2.1% of Nicaragua (1:109), 1.3% of El Salvador (1:180) and 1.2% of Costa Rica (1:152).

In Spain, the frequency of the surname was higher than national average (1:530) in the following autonomous communities:
 1. Ceuta (1:289)
 2. Cantabria (1:302)
 3. Andalusia (1:313)
 4. Melilla (1:323)
 5. Castilla-La Mancha (1:392)
 6. La Rioja (1:418)
 7. Region of Murcia (1:460)
 8. Aragon (1:473)

In Panama, the frequency of the surname was higher than national average (1:61) in the following provinces:
 1. Chiriquí Province (1:37)
 2. Bocas del Toro Province (1:38)
 3. Coclé Province (1:41)
 4. Veraguas Province (1:44)

In the United States, the frequency of Castillo was higher than national average (1:1,813) in the following states:

 1. Texas (1:509)
 2. New Mexico (1:596)
 3. California (1:857)
 4. Arizona (1:1,138)
 5. Nevada (1:1,165)
 6. Hawaii (1:1,168)
 7. Florida (1:1,472)
 8. New York (1:1,805)

See also
Castle (surname)
Castel (surname)

References

Spanish-language surnames